Tricolor or tricolour (from Latin tri- "three" and color "colour"), or tricolored, tricoloured, may refer to:

Flags
 Tricolour, the flags of three bands adopted in the revolutionary republicanist movements of the late 18th and 19th centuries, specifically
 Tiranga, the flag of India
 , the flag of France
 , the flag of Italy
 , the flag of Russia
 the flag of Venezuela, introduced in 2006
 the flag of Mexico, a vertical tricolor with the national coat of arms charged in the center
 the flag of Ireland, frequently referred to as the Irish tricolour
 the flag of Colombia, a horizontal tricolor with a 2:1:1 ratio
 , the flag of the Second Spanish Republic

Sports teams
 Tricolor, the nickname of various Latin American football teams:
 Colombia national football team
 Costa Rica national football team
 Ecuador national football team
 Mexico national football team
 Fluminense Football Club (Tricolor carioca),
 São Paulo Futebol Clube (Tricolor paulista),
 Grêmio Foot-Ball Porto Alegrense (Imortal Tricolor)
 Esporte Clube Bahia (Tricolor baiano)
 Santa Cruz Futebol Clube (Tricolor do Arruda)
 Club Nacional de Football
 Club Nacional
 Tricolor, the nickname of basketball team Quilmes de Mar del Plata
 The Tricolours, a nickname for the National Rugby League team the Sydney Roosters
 Unirea Tricolor București, a former Romanian football club from Bucharest

Other
 Trichromacy, the use of three intensities for the perception and representation of color
 Tricolor (dog), a dog with three coat colors
 Tricolor (game), a rulebook for wargaming with Napoleonic miniatures
 Tricolor TV, the biggest Russian satellite television operator
 MV Tricolor, a Norwegian ship that sank in the English Channel in 2002
 Tricolor River, a river of Paraná state in southern Brazil
 Ulmus × hollandica 'Tricolor', an elm cultivar
 a common sage (Salvia officinalis), cultivar

See also
 Tricoloured (horse), a horse with three coat colours
 Tricolore (disambiguation)
 Tricolorii, the nickname of the Romania national football team
 Bi-color (disambiguation)
 Driekleur trikot